Admiral John de Mestre Hutchison,  (4 September 1862 – 9 October 1932) was a Royal Navy officer who held senior posts during the early part of the 20th century.

John de Mestre Hutchison was born on was 4 September 1862, the son of Captain John Hutchison. The young Hutchison attended Eastman's Naval Academy in Southsea, Portsmouth before he joined the Royal Navy as a cadet in 1876. Hutchison was promoted to sub-lieutenant in 1882 and was promoted from lieutenant to commander on 22 June 1897. At the start of January 1903, Hutchison was promoted to captain, and by 1904 he was serving as the Extra Naval Attache to the Japanese during the Russo-Japanese War. From May 1907 to March 1909 Hutchison commanded , which was part of the Atlantic Fleet.

Hutchison was appointed naval aide-de-camp to King George V on 19 September 1911. Also in 1911 Hutchison was appointed as Commodore of the RN Barracks Devonport, a post he held until 1913 when he was promoted to rear admiral (in May) and relinquished his aide de camp appointment. He retired from the Navy on 9 May 1916 but in early 1918 he was Flag Officer of the Royal Naval Air Service depot at Tregantle and Withnoe in Cornwall.  On 1 April 1918 when the Royal Naval Air Service merged with the Royal Flying Corps to become the Royal Air Force, Hutchison was made a temporary colonel and granted the honorary rank of lieutenant general (both these ranks existed in the RAF during its first year). His command was probably retitled General Officer Commanding, RAF Tregantle and Withnoe Depot.

After the war in 1921, Hutchison was granted the rank of admiral as a retired officer on the Navy list.  He died on 9 October 1932.

References

External links
 Air of Authority – A History of RAF Organisation – Lieutenant-General J de M Hutchison

|-

|-

|-

1862 births
1932 deaths
Commanders of the Royal Victorian Order
Companions of the Order of St Michael and St George
Recipients of the Order of the Sacred Treasure, 2nd class
Royal Air Force generals of World War I
Royal Navy admirals of World War I